The Bayin-Gobi Formation (also known as Bayan Gobi, or Bayingebi Formation) is a geological formation in Inner Mongolia, north China, whose strata date back to Albian of the Early Cretaceous period. Dinosaur remains are among the fossils that have been recovered from the formation.

Paleobiota of the Bayin-Gobi Formation

Dinosaurs

See also

 List of dinosaur-bearing rock formations

References

Geology of Inner Mongolia
Lower Cretaceous Series of Asia
Albian Stage
Cretaceous China
Gobi Desert